Jan Šulc (born 17 February 1979) is a Czech former professional ice hockey centre.  He played in the Czech Extraliga for HC Litvínov and also played in the East Coast Hockey League for the Toledo Storm and Johnstown Chiefs and the International Hockey League for the Detroit Vipers. He was drafted 109th overall by the Tampa Bay Lightning in the 1997 NHL Entry Draft.

Career statistics

External links
 

1979 births
Living people
Czech ice hockey centres
Detroit Vipers players
HC Litvínov players
HC Slovan Ústečtí Lvi players
Johnstown Chiefs players
Kingston Frontenacs players
Owen Sound Platers players
Tampa Bay Lightning draft picks
Toledo Storm players
Toronto St. Michael's Majors players
HC Most players
People from Litvínov
Sportspeople from the Ústí nad Labem Region
Czech expatriate ice hockey players in Canada
Czech expatriate ice hockey players in the United States